Spekia is a genus of freshwater snails, aquatic gastropod mollusks in the family Paludomidae.

Spekia is the type genus of the tribe Spekiini.

Distribution 
The genus Spekia is endemic to Lake Tanganyika.

Species 
For many years only one species was known in this genus, however, in 1999, a second species was described.

The genus Spekia contains the following species:
 Spekia coheni West, 1999
 Spekia zonata (Woodward, 1859)

References

Further reading 
 Moore J. E. S. (1899). "The mollusks of the Great African lakes. 3. Tanganyicia rufofilosa, and the genus Spekia". Quarterly Journal of Microscopical Science 42: 155-185. Plates 14-19. PDF.

Paludomidae
Taxonomy articles created by Polbot
Snails of Lake Tanganyika
Taxa named by Jules René Bourguignat